Wilma "Billie" Tisch (née Stein) is an American philanthropist. She is a graduate of Skidmore College and has served on its board as well as pursuing many other philanthropic ventures.

Biography
Tisch was born on June 25, 1927 in Long Branch, New Jersey but grew up in Asbury Park, New Jersey. Her father, Joseph Stein, the son of German Jewish immigrants, worked as a journalist and later in the automotive industry and opened the first Cadillac dealership in New Jersey; her mother, Rose Liebesman Stein, was the daughter of Lithuanian Jewish immigrants. Her family belonged to a Conservative synagogue. She has one sister, the late Myra Cohn. She attended public schools and graduated with a B.S. from Skidmore College in 1948 with a major in economics and a minor in accounting.

After school, she took a job with Time, Inc as a secretary and soon after was married to Laurence Tisch in 1948. Early in his career, Tisch made his living from kosher hotels which catered to the Jewish community.

Philanthropy
In 1962, she became a trustee of the Blythedale Children's Hospital in Valhalla, New York serving on its board of directors. In 1969, she became a member of the Distribution Committee of Federation of Jewish Philanthropies which was responsible for allocating resources to charities that supported the Jewish community. She was instrumental in obtaining Federation sponsorship for Blythedale which also ran a program on joint disease in addition to being a children's hospital. In 1975, she became chairman of the Distribution Committee of the Federation. In 1980, she became the first woman to serve as president of the Federation of Jewish Philanthropies serving until 1983. She also served as the board chairwoman of the WNYC Foundation, Vice Chairman of United Way of New York City, Director of the Tisch Foundation, Trustee of Skidmore College, Trustee of the American Jewish Joint Distribution Committee, Trustee of the September 11th Fund, and served on the Mayor’s Transition Advisory Council of New York City.

In 1976, she received the Louis Marshall Medal from the Jewish Theological Seminary for "consecrated service to Judaism and the American Jewish Community". In 2006, she received an honorary doctorate from New York University for "extraordinary leadership and generosity across an array of civic and philanthropic endeavors".

Personal life 
In 1948, Tisch married Laurence Tisch, a real estate developer. They had four sons.
Andrew H. Tisch (born 1949)
Daniel Tisch - runs a family fund, Mentor Partners, is active in Jewish causes, and sits on the New York University board. He is the father of David Tisch.
James S. Tisch (born 1953)
Thomas Jonah Tisch - Works as a partner at FLF Associates, a private investment group in New York City. In 1985, he married Helen Vivian Scovell; the service was officiated by Rabbi Philip Hiat.

References

Living people
Skidmore College alumni
Female billionaires
People from Manhattan
Jewish American philanthropists
American socialites
American billionaires
Philanthropists from New York (state)
Wilma Tisch
1927 births